Ebbe Schön (13 December 1929 – 4 August 2022) was a Swedish author, folklorist and associate professor in literature at Stockholm University. Besides literature, he studied ethnology, Scandinavian languages and Slavonic languages at Stockholm University.

Among other things, he worked as a naval radio operator and as a press officer and film producer at the Swedish Naval Staff, and was a radio and TV producer at Swedish Radio and Swedish Television. Schön was the head of Sweden's largest folklore collection at the Nordic Museum in Stockholm for almost two decades. He wrote many books about literature, folklore and Norse mythology, both for adults and children.

Bibliography
 Jan Fridegård och forntiden (doctor's dissertation) (1973)
 Jan Fridegård (1978)
 Julen förr i tiden (1980)
 Folktro i Bohuslän (1983)
 Älvor, vättar och andra väsen (1986)
 Trollguld (1986)
 Karolinens pojke (1988)
 Folktrons år (1989)
 Roddarpojken (1990)
 Häxor och trolldom (1991)
 Luffar-Olas rim och ramsor (1991)
 Kungar, krig och katastrofer (1993)
 Älskogens magi (1996)
 Vår svenska tomte (1996)
 Troll (1997)
 Sjöjungfrur, stenhuggare och gnistapor (1997)
 Svensk folktro A-Ö (1998)
 Svenska traditioner (1998)
 Troll och människa (1999)
 Drakar och trollormar (1999)
 De döda återvänder (2000)
 Älvor, troll och talande träd (2000)
 Folktro från förr (2001)
 Skepnader i skymningen (2001)
 Folktro om ödet och lyckan (2002)
 Silverpipan (2002)
 Trollkistan (2003)
 Asa-Tors hammare (2004)
 Folktrons ABC (2004)
 Kungar, krig och katastrofer (new enlarged edition) (2005)
 Vår svenske tomte (new enlarged edition) (2006)
 Folktro på fäbodvall (2006) 
 Jätten i Brofjäll (2007)
 Svenska sägner (2008)
 Häxkonster och kärleksknep (2008)
 Ödet och lyckan (new edition of Folktro om ödet och lyckan) (2009)
 Erotiska väsen (2010)
 Kungar, krig och katastrofer (new enlarged edition) (2011)
 Fotspår på röd granit (2012)
 Gårdstomtens långa minne (2014)
 Fan i båten (2015)
 Mat, dryck och magi (2016)
 Gårdstomten på Ryk (2018)
 Vår svenske tomte (new enlarged edition) (2018)
 Ängel med bockfot (2019)
 Gårdstomtens tårar (2022)

Besides, Ebbe Schön participates in a number of anthologies, newspapers, magazines and yearbooks.

Awards and honours 
 Studieförbundet Vuxenskolans folkbildningsstipendium (1989)
 Bohuslandstingets kulturpris (1990)
 Mickelpriset awarded by Berättarnätet Kronoberg and Studieförbundet Vuxenskolan in Ljungby (1999)
 Kungl. Patriotiska Sällskapets Gösta Berg-medalj (2004)
 Jöran Sahlgren-pris awarded by Kungl. Gustav Adolfs Akademien för svensk folkkultur (2005)
 Bohusläningens kulturpris (2011)

References 
 
 Berättarnätet Kronoberg. Mickelpriset.
 Författarförmedlingen: Ebbe Schön.
 Ekman, Arne. NE i tjugo band: En modern och komprimerad version av det stora uppslagsverket. Malmö: Nationalencyklopedin (NE), 2009.
 Heurling, Bo. Författaren själv: Ett biografiskt lexikon av och om 1189 samtida svenska författare. Höganäs: Wiken, 1993.
 Vem är det: Svensk biografisk handbok. Stockholm: Norstedt, 1912–.

External links 
 LIBRIS
 

1929 births
2022 deaths
People from Lysekil Municipality
Swedish-language writers
Swedish folklorists
Folklore writers
Swedish literary scholars
Academic staff of Stockholm University
Writers on Germanic paganism
Swedish Navy officers